Mese District is the district of Kayah State, Myanmar. Its principal town is Mese. This district borders Mae Hong Son Province of Thailand and has an open border trading station.

Townships

The townships, cities, towns that are included in Mese District are as follows:
Mese Township
Mese

History
On April 30, 2022, new districts were expanded and organized. Mese Township from Bawlakhe District is promoted as a district.

References

Districts of Myanmar
Kayah State